"Twilight Is Gone" is a song by the American country rock band The Desert Rose Band, released in 1991 as the second and final single from their fourth studio album True Love. It was written by Chris Hillman and Steve Hill, and produced by Tony Brown.

Like the preceding single "You Can Go Home", "Twilight Is Gone" continued the band's commercial decline on both the American and Canadian Country Singles Charts. "Twilight Is Gone" peaked at No. 67 on the Billboard Hot Country Songs Chart, and No. 82 on the RPM Country Singles Chart.

Release
"Twilight Is Gone" was released by Records in America and Canada only, on 7" vinyl and as a one-track promotional CD. For its release as a single, "Twilight is Gone" was edited and reduced in duration by almost half a minute. It was dubbed the "Edited Version". The 7" vinyl featured the True Love album track "Shades of Blue" as the B-side, which was written by Hillman and Hill. The single was distributed by UNL Distribution Corp.

Critical reception
Upon release, Cash Box listed the single as one of their "feature picks" during December 1991. They commented: "The chimes of vocal harmony showcased here are near excellent, as well as every ounce of work put into this new single. "Twilight Is Gone," the newest release from the Desert Rose Band's True Love package, unwinds a caressing tune that's quilted with heartwarming lyrics and a mind-sinking melody." Billboard commented: "While tugging at the heartstrings, harmonies explode with color. Lush melody and pristine performance keep all ears pinned."

In a review of True Love, Record-Journal said: "The best songs provide quiet pleasures that grow with repeated listenings, like the acoustic guitar interplay between Herb Pedersen and John Jorgenson on Hillman's ballad "Twilight is Gone"." In a 1993 review of the band's follow-up album Life Goes On, the Los Angeles Times mentioned the song being performed live: "The strongest of the band's catalogue tunes, perhaps because it has been heard the least, was "Twilight Is Gone," the saving grace of the otherwise moribund True Love album. Supported by Pedersen's aching Dobro tones and Bryson's melodic bass lines, Hillman, Pedersen and Bryson's harmonies were nothing short of thrilling." In a press release for the True Love album, issued by Curb Records, the song was described as a "quiet ballad", which spoke of "the changes in a relationship that occur after the initial fire has died down".

Track listing
7" Single
"Twilight Is Gone" - 3:15
"Shades of Blue" - 3:25

CD Single (US promo)
"Twilight Is Gone" - 3:15

Chart performance

Personnel
The Desert Rose Band
 Chris Hillman - Lead vocals, acoustic guitar
 Herb Pedersen - Acoustic guitar, backing vocals
 John Jorgenson - Lead guitar, backing vocals
 Bill Bryson - Bass guitar
 Steve Duncan - Drums
 Tom Brumley - Pedal steel guitar

Additional personnel
 Tony Brown - producer

References

1991 singles
The Desert Rose Band songs
MCA Records singles
Curb Records singles
Songs written by Chris Hillman
Song recordings produced by Tony Brown (record producer)
1991 songs